A stereo dipole is a sound source in an Ambiophonic system, made by two closely spaced loudspeakers that ideally span 10-30 degrees.  Thanks to the cross-talk cancellation method, a stereo dipole can render an acoustic stereo image nearly 180° wide (single stereo dipole) or 360° (dual or double stereo dipole).

Stereophonic sound